Ákos Inotay (21 May 1911 – 1960) was a Hungarian rower. He competed at the 1936 Summer Olympics in Berlin with the men's coxed four where they came fifth.

References

External links 
 

1911 births
1960 deaths
Hungarian male rowers
Olympic rowers of Hungary
Rowers at the 1936 Summer Olympics
People from Bačka Topola
European Rowing Championships medalists